Glena is a genus of moths in the family Geometridae.

Species
Glena agria Rindge, 1967
Glena arcana Rindge, 1958
Glena asaccula Rindge, 1967
Glena basalis Rindge, 1967
Glena bipennaria (Guenée, 1858)
Glena bisulca Rindge, 1967
Glena brachia Rindge, 1967
Glena bulla Rindge, 1967
Glena cognataria (Hubner, 1831)
Glena cretacea (Butler, 1881)
Glena cribrataria (Guenée, 1857)
Glena demissaria (Walker, 1860)
Glena dentata Rindge, 1967
Glena effusa Rindge, 1967
Glena furfuraria (Hulst, 1888)
Glena gampsa Rindge, 1967
Glena gemina Rindge, 1967
Glena granillosa (Dognin, 1902)
Glena grisearia (Grote, 1883)
Glena hima Rindge, 1967
Glena interpunctata (Barnes & McDunnough, 1917)
Glena juga Rindge, 1967
Glena labecula Rindge, 1967
Glena laticolla Rindge, 1967
Glena lora Rindge, 1967
Glena mcdunnougharia Sperry, 1952
Glena megale Rindge, 1967
Glena mielkei Vargas, 2010
Glena mopsaria (Schaus, 1913)
Glena nepia (Druce, 1892)
Glena nigricaria (Barnes & McDunnough, 1913)
Glena plumosaria (Packard, 1874)
Glena quadrata Rindge, 1967
Glena quinquelinearia (Packard, 1874)
Glena sacca Rindge, 1967
Glena subannulata (Prout, 1910)
Glena sucula Rindge, 1967
Glena totana Rindge, 1967
Glena trapezia Rindge, 1967
Glena turba Rindge, 1967
Glena tyrbe Rindge, 1967
Glena uncata Rindge, 1967
Glena unipennaria (Guenée, 1858)
Glena vesana Rindge, 1967
Glena zweifeli Rindge, 1965

References

  2010: A new species of Glena Hulst (Lepidoptera, Geometridae) from northern Chile. Revista Brasileira de Entomologia 54 (1): 42–44. DOI: 10.1590/S0085-56262010000100005. Full article: .

External links

Boarmiini